is a Japanese pole vaulter. She represented her country at two-time Asian Championships and one-time Asian Indoor Championships. She is a two-time national champion.

Personal bests

International competition

National titles
Japanese Championships
Pole vault: 2013, 2015

References

External links

Kanae Tatsuta at Nippatsu 

1992 births
Living people
Sportspeople from Osaka
Japanese female pole vaulters
Japan Championships in Athletics winners